KTM Komuter is a commuter rail system in Malaysia operated by Keretapi Tanah Melayu (KTM). It was introduced in 1995 to provide local rail services in Kuala Lumpur and the surrounding Klang Valley suburban areas.  Services were later expanded to other parts of Malaysia with the introduction of the Northern and Southern sectors.

The service uses air-conditioned electric multiple units in 3 and 6 car formations.

KTM Komuter contributed RM146.2 million to group revenue in 2017, carrying a total of 37.235 million passengers. The total number of passengers travelling with KTM Komuter in 2017 shows a decrease of 10.2%. This can be attributed to reduced service frequency due to the ongoing Klang Valley Double Tracking (KVDT) rehabilitation project.

Network

Current Network

Central Sector

KTM Komuter's 287 km (109 mi) network in the Central Sector mainly covers the Klang Valley. It has 53 stations. It consists of two cross-city routes, namely the Port Klang Line (Tanjung Malim to Port Klang) and Seremban Line (Batu Caves to Pulau Sebang/Tampin).

Transfers between the two main lines can be made at any of the four stations on the central core: KL Sentral, Kuala Lumpur, Bank Negara and Putra. Same-platform or cross-platform interchange is available at Kuala Lumpur.

The KTM Skypark Link from KL Sentral station  to Terminal Skypark  is a limited express service for passengers headed towards Subang Airport. To save time, it only stops at Subang Jaya   The link is the second of its kind in Malaysia.

The routes have been modified over the years. Previously, Seremban Line trains would head towards Tanjong Malim while Port Klang Line trains would head to Batu Caves. Following a successful trial, the routes were swapped. Trains from Seremban began heading towards Batu Caves, while trains from Port Klang headed towards Tanjong Malim.

The service is subject to overcrowding during rush hours. Several steps were taken to alleviate this. Firstly, the operator introduced a new queuing system, in which the lines are painted on the floor with three colour codes representing each of the train set.  Trains were also run in 3+3 formations, although this has been discontinued with the introduction of six-car sets. An express service from Seremban to KL Sentral is available during rush hour.

Northern Sector

The Northern Sector KTM Komuter Shuttle (Tren Shuttle KTM Komuter Sektor Utara in Bahasa Malaysia) service initially operated between Gurun in Kedah, Butterworth in Penang and Kamunting in Perak. This followed the completion of electrification works on that stretch.

The route has been modified multiple times since. Today, there are two lines, namely from Padang Besar to Butterworth and from Bukit Mertajam to Padang Rengas. Bukit Mertajam is the only interchange station between the two lines.

Southern Sector (discontinued)
The KTM Komuter Southern Sector (Malay: KTM Komuter Sektor Selatan) operated from Seremban to Gemas following the completion of electrification works on that stretch. This was the second KTM Komuter service outside the Klang Valley after the northern counterpart. The Gemas and Batang Melaka stops were removed starting 20 June 2016 with the train running between Seremban and Pulau Sebang/Tampin. Subsequently, the shuttle service was terminated on 11 July 2016 when it was absorbed into the Seremban Line.

History 
The service started on 12 August 1995 from Kuala Lumpur to Rawang, on what was the original Seremban Line. The line was extended to Salak Selatan on 29 September 1995. Operations between Sentul and Shah Alam began on 28 August 1995, on what was the original Port Klang Line. This line was extended to Klang on 29 September 1995. The Seremban Line was extended to Kajang on 20 November 1995 and to Seremban itself on 18 December 1995. This would form the Komuter network for more than a decade.

In the early 2000s, more stations were added along the existing route. KL Sentral was added on 16 April 2001 and served as the new transport hub of Kuala Lumpur. Mid Valley station was added on 23 August 2004, serving the surrounding Mid Valley Megamall. Kepong Sentral was added on 1 July 2006.

The Seremban-KL Sentral express service was introduced on 9 December 2004 The service was discontinued later before being reintroduced again on 25 July 2018. These services run only during the rush hour.

The route was expanded for the first time since 1995 when train services on the Seremban Line were extended to Rasa in 2007. Initially, KTM Komuter services to the new stations north of Rawang was run as a shuttle service. The route was extended to Kuala Kubu Bharu in January 2008, and finally to Tanjung Malim on 1 June 2009. The Rawang-Tanjung Malim shuttle service was absorbed into the main Port Klang Line on 11 July 2016.

Women-only coaches were introduced on 28 April 2010.

The Port Klang Line was extended to Batu Caves on 29 July 2010. Four intermediate new stations, Batu Kentonmen, Kampung Batu and Taman Wahyu were opened with this extension.

The Seremban Line was extended from Seremban to Sungai Gadut on 14 May 2011 with an intermediate station at Senawang, and to Rembau in 2013.

Northern Sector services were introduced on 11 September 2015 between Gurun in Kedah, Butterworth in Penang and Kamunting in Perak. This followed the completion of the Ipoh-Padang Besar Electrification and Double-Tracking Project in December 2014. On 1 January 2016, a second line was introduced between Butterworth and Padang Besar in Perlis, while on 17 January 2016, the Gurun-Butterworth-Kamunting route was replaced with two separate routes: Butterworth-Gurun and Butterworth-Kamunting. The three-line service operated until 1 July 2016 when the Butterworth-Gurun route was dropped, and subsequently on 1 September 2016, the route took on its current form.

Southern Sector services were introduced on 10 October 2015 following the completion of the Seremban-Gemas Electrified Double Tracking Project on 30 October 2013. This service is the second KTM Komuter service outside the Klang Valley after its northern counterpart. The Gemas and Batang Melaka stops were removed starting 20 June 2016 with the train running between Seremban and Pulau Sebang/Tampin. Subsequently, the shuttle service was terminated on 11 July 2016 when it was absorbed into the Seremban Line.

From 15 December 2015, the routes of Seremban Line and Port Klang Line were switched as part of a six-month trial. Trains from Seremban began heading towards Batu Caves, while trains from Port Klang headed towards Rawang, and vice versa. Transfers could be done at the four shared stations.

The Skypark Link to Subang Airport was introduced on 1 May 2018.

Beginning 10 September 2018, all service abolished the cash ticketing system, cashless ticketing method was then compulsory.

Stations
The Komuter service was largely built from existing lines, with minor alterations (i.e. removal or abandonment of lines and replacement of wooden sleepers with concrete ones). Relevant station platforms were added and heightened to allow easier access to Komuter trains travelling in both directions.

Major pre-independence stations including Kuala Lumpur station, Klang station, Port Klang station and Seremban station were retained and upgraded to support Komuter services. Smaller, wood-based stations and halts along the line that were built at around the same time were either demolished and replaced by modern brick-and-concrete counterparts, or simply abandoned. The only exception to the rule is the old Sentul station, which has remained in service years since KTM Komuter's launch, albeit with a replacement platform.

The layouts and sizes of the new station buildings, as of the launch of the service in 1995, vary by location but are generally divided into two classes:

Railway halts, consisting of a small single-storey structure with only ticket counters (a ticket booth, ticket machines and faregates). The stations are usually placed along straightforward dual-lane lines.
Medium-sized and single-storey stations, housing both the ticket counters and station offices, and typically stationed along three or more lines. Such stations are typically intended to support additional responsibilities, such as managing railway signals, controlling points and handling goods services. The stations themselves are similar in design to the original wood-based stations along the line with slight hints of Western colonial designs (arches, wooden-and-glass windows and wooden doors), but are larger and modernised.

Some stations also have parking facilities.

The platforms of the 1995 stations are virtually standardised, down to the design of the passenger semicircle-crossed shelters, the use of similarly-styled foot crossings to link all platforms, and the diamonds-based brickwork of the platforms.

Depending on the number of patrons through the years, each station has undergone upgrades or expansions that consist of either increasing the number of ticket counters or opening new facilities for use by passengers or railway staff. Taller, wider canopies were erected on the platforms of most stations to replace narrower, original versions in 2006 and 2007. The pace of the upgrades varies by location.

During the 2000s, new stations such as the Mid Valley station appeared in more modern designs, consisting primarily of high, curved canopies above the entire platforms. Certain new stations along dual-lane lines are also included with facilities typically reserved for medium-sized stations, such as the Rasa station. The Kuala Lumpur Sentral station, however, is housed under the concrete base of the transport hub, and is stark and utilitarian in design.

Rolling stock
The original Komuter rolling stock consists of three versions of three-car EMUs added over the course of three years, beginning in 1994. The EMUs were the first in KTM's history. All Komuter EMUs operate in multiple-unit formation, running from overhead single-phase 25 kV AC 50 Hz catenary supply, with two driving cars and 1 trailer car in between. The EMUs were state-of-the-art, with remote-controlled pneumatic doors, Automatic Train Protection (ATP), train data recorder, wheel-slip control, GTO/IGBT traction electronics and regenerative braking. Up to the point of their introduction, no other KTM motive power used these modern train control systems.

Designated by KTM as "Class 8x"s, the EMUs wear a yellow, blue and grey livery, a departure from the predominantly grey livery that KTM adopted on other locomotives and passenger coaches at the time. A handful of EMUs include full advertisements on the sides of their cars.

The original Komuter fleet consisted of the following models:

The Class 8x suffered from more mechanical problems as they aged, especially the Class 81 and Class 82, which had poor reliability. The manufacturers of both classes had gone bankrupt since the trains were built, hence spare parts became unavailable. On paper, the number of serviceable units in 2010 stood at 53 out of the original 62, although there are reports of far fewer trains. Ultimately, four Class 81 sets were refurbished, albeit with new motors from Hyundai instead of Jenbacher. All Class 82s were taken out of service.

In 2012, six-car Class 92s were introduced, replacing most of the Class 8x in the central sector. A handful of them remain, usually on the Skypark Link or Sentul-Batu Caves shuttle, but many have been reallocated to the northern sector.

Ridership
Ridership statistics published by the Ministry of Transport are for all KTM Komuter services. No separate statistics for the individual lines or operational regions are published. Statistics before 1999 are also not available.

Incidents and accidents

 On the evening of 3 March 2004, a Seremban-bound KTM Komuter train in the Seremban Line collided with the rear of another Komuter train facing the same direction, which had been waiting at a signal between Tiroi station and Seremban station for five minutes. Forty were injured, but no deaths were reported. The accident was ascribed to the faulty signal light (struck by lightning) that stopped the earlier train, though the driver of the rear-ending train is reported to have run a red light into the section occupied by the rear-ended train. The resulting crash disrupted KTM Komuter services along the line for a day. This is so far the worst accident involving the KTM Komuter service.

On 2 March 2007, a crane fell onto a KTM Komuter train track near the Sentul-Port Klang Route's Shah Alam Komuter station, stranding about 10,000 passengers and cancelling 40 trips. Alternative transport services were provided.
On 25 May 2007, a person was killed after he was hit by a KTM Komuter train while crossing the tracks illegally. Deaths in this manner have occurred along Komuter lines before.
On 27 February 2008, overhead power cables between Subang Jaya and Petaling stations of the Sentul-Port Klang route broke, causing all train services to be modified to run on the Sentul-Petaling route instead.
On 22 October 2009, a multipurpose vehicle plunged into the railway track as it was heading from Kuala Lumpur towards Subang Jaya. Train services were disrupted, and the vehicle was towed away 3 hours after the accident.
On 4 February 2013, A woman in her 50s was run over by a commuter train at the Taman Wahyu KTM Komuter Station. The victim was said to have been dragged 50m along the track in the incident.
On 15 February 2013 at 23:00, an out-of-service KTM Class 92 SCS 20 derailed near Shah Alam station while returning to Sentul depot for maintenance. No one was injured. The train was heavily damaged and was subsequently written off.
On 1 November 2013, a 3 coach KTM Class 83 derailed near Rawang station while moving through a track switch. No one was hurt in the incident. The two rear coaches were separated and towed away using a locomotive while the remaining front coach removed by use of cranes.
On 18 September 2017, KTM train services suffered a major disruption after an electrical cable snapped at KM361.76 on the tracks between the Rawang and Kuang stations, causing closure to both of the rail tracks.

Gallery

See also
Keretapi Tanah Melayu
KTM Intercity
KTM West Coast Line
KTM East Coast Line
KTM ETS
KTM Komuter
 Seremban Line
 Port Klang Line
 Skypark Link
 Padang Rengas Line & Padang Besar Line
Rail transport in Malaysia
Public transport in Kuala Lumpur

Notes

References

External links

The KTM Komuter at the Keretapi Tanah Melayu website
KTM Komuter Schedule App: Solving The Main Problem for KTM Komuter Customers

 
Keretapi Tanah Melayu